Södermanland County is a county or län on the southeast coast of Sweden. In the local Sörmlandic dialects it is virtually universally shortened and pronounced as Sörmlands län, or simply Sörmland, which is the dominant pronunciation and spelling inside the county. For example, the name of the local regional council is Region Sörmland. It borders the counties of Östergötland, Örebro, Västmanland, Uppsala, Stockholm and to the Baltic Sea. It holds the popular camping route called "Sörmlandsleden" which is a system of trails covering a total of approximately 100 mil (1000 km) of walking paths, in Södermanland.

It is an administrative unit, covering most of the province Södermanland. The eastern parts of the Södermanland province, largely corresponding to the Södertörn area, belong to Stockholm County. As a result of this longstanding divide, only areas inside the county are usually considered as Sörmlandic as opposed to a part of the extended Stockholm metropolitan area.

Geography and climate 
Södermanland runs between the lake Mälaren to the north and the Baltic Sea to its east and south. The centre of Södermanland is spread out between four municipality seats namely Vingåker, Katrineholm, Flen and Gnesta that separate the southern and northern areas of the county. Most parts are low-lying being part of the Mälar valley, but some higher areas can be found. The interior of Södermanland has many small rolling hills, courtesy of glacial rebound that has shaped the landscape of the area. The coastline on the Baltic Sea has many bays connected to it, with Nyköping being well-shielded from the open sea by a peninsula with plenty of inlets. Offshore there are also plenty of islets making up the Sörmlandic archipelago. The county has lake tripoints with Stockholm and Uppsala in Mälaren, with Västmanland and Örebro in Hjälmaren and a land tri-point with Örebro and Östergötland just south of Högsjö. The southwest of the county marks the southernmost points of the greater regions of Svealand and the Mälar valley.

The climate much like other parts of southern Sweden is a mix between oceanic and moderated continental. It can heavily fluctuate between different years with influences from different weather systems. Most often winters are still pronounced enough for the climate to be a clear four-season climate although the open sea most often remains ice-free year round.

Politics 
Region Sörmland is the name of the regional council of Södermanland, the county's self-governing local authority.

As of 2019, the local government constellation consists of the Social Democrats, Vård för Pengarna and the Centre Party. The coalition holds a majority in the regional council with 42 seats out of 71 total.

2018 election results

Riksdag elections
The table details all Riksdag election results of Södermanland County since the unicameral era began in 1970. The blocs denote which party would support the Prime Minister or the lead opposition party towards the end of the elected parliament.

Municipalities 
Eskilstuna
Flen
Gnesta
Katrineholm
Nyköping
Oxelösund
Strängnäs
Trosa
Vingåker

Demographics

Foreign background 
SCB have collected statistics on backgrounds of residents since 2002. These tables consist of all who have two foreign-born parents or are born abroad themselves. The chart lists election years and the last year on record alone.

Urban areas by population 
This is a list of Södermanland's urban areas or tätorter (dense localities with a population of at least 200).

Heraldry 
Södermanland County inherited its coat of arms from the province of Södermanland. When it is shown with a royal crown it represents the County Administrative Board.

History 
The province of Södermanland was divided into three counties in the 17th century; Nyköping County, Gripsholm County and Eskilstunahus County. They were merged into present day Södermanland County in 1683.

References and notes

External links 

Södermanland County Administrative Board
Södermanland County Council
Regional Association of Södermanland

 

 
Counties of Sweden
County
1634 establishments in Sweden
States and territories established in 1634